"Superman" is a song by the Stereophonics. It is the first track on their fifth studio album, Language. Sex. Violence. Other? (2005). The song was released as the second single from the album on 20 June 2005, peaking at number 13 on the UK Singles Chart. The song is featured on the live CD/DVD, Live from Dakota at which they opened with Superman, like they have done in many gigs since the release of the track.

Charts

References

2005 singles
2005 songs
Songs written by Kelly Jones
Stereophonics songs
V2 Records singles